Fabijan Cipot (born 25 August 1976) is a retired Slovenian football defender.

Club career
Cipot started his career at his hometown club Bakovci. As a youngster he moved to a nearby Mura. He made his Mura debut on 7 May 1997 in a 1. SNL tie with Rudar Velenje. In the following season he established himself as a regular first team player. In January 2000 he left Mura and signed with Maribor. After four seasons with Maribor, he moved to Qatar, where he played for Al-Sadd SC and Al-Arabi SC. After three seasons in Qatar, he returned to Europe. His trial in summer 2005 at Norwegian Brann ended with injury suffered in a friendly match against Birmingham City. He returned in spring 2006, playing for Nafta Lendava. In summer 2006 he signed with Maribor. After a year in Maribor, he moved to Swiss side Lucerne. In February 2008 he left Lucerne and signed with Rudar Velenje. In June 2011 he left Rudar Velenje and signed a contract with Mura 05.

International career
Cipot has been capped 26 times for the Slovenian national team between 1999 and 2007.

Personal life
Cipot's sons Kai and Tio are also professional footballers.

References

External links
Player profile at NZS 

1976 births
Living people
People from Murska Sobota
Slovenian footballers
Association football defenders
NK Mura players
NK Maribor players
Al Sadd SC players
Al-Arabi SC (Qatar) players
NK Nafta Lendava players
FC Luzern players
NK Rudar Velenje players
ND Mura 05 players
Slovenian PrvaLiga players
Qatar Stars League players
Swiss Super League players
Slovenian Second League players
Slovenian expatriate footballers
Expatriate footballers in Qatar
Expatriate footballers in Switzerland
Slovenian expatriate sportspeople in Qatar
Slovenian expatriate sportspeople in Switzerland
Slovenia international footballers
Slovenian football managers